Adewale Oluson Olukoju (born 27 July 1968) is a Nigerian athlete who competed in discus throw and shot put. He was very prominent in African athletics in the late 1980s and early 1990s, winning four gold medals in total at the All-Africa Games.

His personal best discus throw is 67.80 metres, which he achieved in May 1991. Olukoju is married to sprinter Fatima Yusuf.

International competitions

External links
 
 
 

1968 births
Living people
People from Zaria
Nigerian male shot putters
Nigerian male discus throwers
Olympic male discus throwers
Olympic athletes of Nigeria
Athletes (track and field) at the 1988 Summer Olympics
Athletes (track and field) at the 1996 Summer Olympics
Commonwealth Games gold medallists for Nigeria
Commonwealth Games gold medallists in athletics
Athletes (track and field) at the 1990 Commonwealth Games
African Games gold medalists for Nigeria
African Games silver medalists for Nigeria
African Games medalists in athletics (track and field)
Athletes (track and field) at the 1987 All-Africa Games
Athletes (track and field) at the 1991 All-Africa Games
Athletes (track and field) at the 1995 All-Africa Games
Universiade gold medalists for Nigeria
Universiade silver medalists for Nigeria
Universiade medalists in athletics (track and field)
Medalists at the 1991 Summer Universiade
Medalists at the 1993 Summer Universiade
World Athletics Championships athletes for Nigeria
Japan Championships in Athletics winners
Yoruba sportspeople
Commonwealth Games competitors for Nigeria
20th-century Nigerian people
Medallists at the 1990 Commonwealth Games